Chervone is a toponym of several populated localities in Ukraine, predominantly villages.

Chervone, Zhytomyr Oblast, an urban-type settlement in Berdychiv Raion, Zhytomyr Oblast
Chervone-Pustohorod was a Soviet air base
Former name of Stare Selo, a village in Sumy Oblast in Ukraine
Former name of Esman, a village in Sumy Oblast, Ukraine